Duje Bajrušović (born 27 October 1984), is a Croatian futsal player who plays for MNK Split Brodosplit Inženjering and the Croatia national futsal team.

References

External links
UEFA profile

1984 births
Living people
Croatian men's futsal players